The Gulf of Morbihan is a natural harbour on the coast of the department of Morbihan in southern Brittany, France. Its English name is taken from the French version, le golfe du Morbihan, though it would be more precisely called 'the Morbihan' as its Breton name 'Ar Mor Bihan' means 'the little sea'. (Compare the Welsh y môr bychan), as opposed to the Atlantic Ocean outside, (Ar Mor Bras). Legend says that there are as many islands in the Gulf as there are days of the year. In fact the gulf has about 40, depending on the tides. Many islands are private property, except the largest two, Île-aux-Moines and Île-d'Arz.

The area around the gulf features an extraordinary range of megalithic monuments. There are passage dolmens, stepped pyramids with underground dolmen chambers, stone circles, and giant menhirs, among others. The site best known to outsiders is Carnac, where remains of a dozen rows of huge standing stones run for over ten kilometers. The passage grave of Gavrinis, on a small island in the Gulf, is one of the most important such sites in Europe. Some of the ruins have been dated to at least 3300 BC — 200 years older than England's Stonehenge.

Geography

Tides and currents
The gulf is sheltered from the Atlantic Ocean by the peninsula of Rhuys, but a 1 km long gap between Port-Navalo (in the commune of Arzon) and Kerpenhir (commune of Locmariaquer) lets the water in and out. Because this gap is narrow, the tidal currents are strong and water speeds can reach up to 9.4 knots.

Festivals
Every alternate year a yachting festival is held, it is known as 'La Semaine du Golfe Du Morbihan' celebrating the Brittany's culture, music and boating and marine traditions. In 2017, 1,450 boats entered the regatta in addition to the hundreds of spectator craft. The highlight of the festival is a 'Big Parade of Sail' in which all the boats are displayed en route from Port Navalo to Vannes.

Communes
 Locmariaquer
 Auray
 Plougoumelen
 Le Bono
 Baden
 Larmor-Baden
 Arradon
 Île-aux-Moines
 Île-d'Arz
 Vannes
 Séné
 Theix
 Noyalo
 Le Hézo
 Saint-Armel
 Sarzeau
 Saint-Gildas-de-Rhuys
 Arzon

External links
 Gulf of Morbihan photos
 Discover Brittany and the Gulf of Morbihan during a virtual visit that includes thousands of items of useful information.  

Morbihan
Ramsar sites in Metropolitan France
Landforms of Brittany